The SuS Stadtlohn (full name: Spiel- und Sportverein Stadtlohn 19/20 e.V.) is the largest sports club in the city of Stadtlohn, North Rhine-Westphalia, Germany. The association was founded in 1919 and has around 2512 members. The soccer department has the most members, followed by the athletics and handball departments. In 2019 the sports club celebrated its 100th anniversary.

History

Club history 
In 1919 the SC 1919 Stadtlohn was founded. A year later, the game club DJK 1920 Stadtlohn was founded. Both associations were forced to merge in 1933 under the name TuS Stadtlohn, which was renamed SuS 1945 Stadtlohn on July 19, 1945, and has had its current name since 1947. The former game club DJK 1920 founded an independent club in 1952 with the DJK Stadtlohn.

Soccer 
The first squad of its soccer division played in the Oberliga Westfalen for 13 seasons, from 1994 to 1995 through 2016–17. Its best Oberliga Westfalen league final position was the 5th spot. In 2018–19 it relegated from the 14th place in Landesliga Westfalen 4. In 1919–20 it plays in the Bezirksliga of Westphalia.

Other departments 
The club consists of twelve departments: athletics, sports badges, running, handball, courses, gymnastics, swimming, trampoline, dancing, table tennis, triathlon, and football. Another department is the youth team (J-Team), which represents the interests of the younger athletes in the club.

See also 
 List of clubs in the Oberliga Westfalen

References 

 
Football clubs in Germany
Stadtlohn
Football clubs in North Rhine-Westphalia
Association football clubs established in 1919
1919 establishments in Germany
Sports clubs established in 1919
Bezirksliga